Boniface Lele (April 14, 1947 – April 9, 2014) was a Roman Catholic bishop.

Ordained to the priesthood in 1974, Lele was named bishop of the Roman Catholic Diocese of Kitui, Kenya, in 1995. He was named archbishop of the Roman Catholic Archdiocese of Mombasa in 2005 and resigned in 2013.
He died on April 9, 2014 from a heart attack at the age of 66, five days before his 67th birthday.

Notes

1947 births
2014 deaths
21st-century Roman Catholic archbishops in Kenya
20th-century Roman Catholic bishops in Kenya
Roman Catholic bishops of Kitui
Roman Catholic bishops of Machakos
Roman Catholic archbishops of Mombasa